The 2011–12 Taça de Portugal (also known as the 2011–12 Taça de Portugal Millenium) was the 72nd season of the Taça de Portugal (English: Portuguese Cup), the premier Portuguese football knockout competition, organized by the Portuguese Football Federation (FPF). The final was played on 20 May 2012 between Académica de Coimbra, returning to the final for the first time since 1969, and Sporting CP, and was won by Associação Acadêmica de Coimbra. The winners qualified for the group stage of the 2012–13 UEFA Europa League.

Porto were the previous holders, having won the competition for a third consecutive time after beating Vitória de Guimarães 6–2 in the previous season's final. However, Porto was not able to defend the title as they were defeated 3–0 by Académica de Coimbra in the fourth round.

Calendar

Participating Teams

Primeira Liga 
(16 Teams)

Associação Académica de Coimbra – Organismo Autónomo de Futebol
Sport Clube Beira-Mar
Sport Lisboa e Benfica
Gil Vicente Futebol Clube
Clube Desportivo Feirense
Club Sport Marítimo
Clube Desportivo Nacional "da Madeira"
Sporting Clube Olhanense

Futebol Clube Paços de Ferreira
Futebol Clube do Porto
Rio Ave Futebol Clube
Sporting Clube de Portugal
Sporting Clube de Braga
União Desportiva de Leiria
Vitória Sport Clube "de Guimarães"
Vitória Futebol Clube "de Setúbal"

Liga de Honra 
(16 Teams)

 Futebol Clube de Arouca
 Atlético Clube de Portugal
 Clube de Futebol Os Belenenses
 Clube Desportivo das Aves
 Grupo Desportivo Estoril Praia
 Sport Clube Freamunde
 Leixões Sport Club
 Moreirense Futebol Clube

 Associação Naval 1º de Maio
 União Desportiva Oliveirense
 Futebol Clube de Penafiel
 Portimonense Sporting Clube
 Clube Desportivo Santa Clara
 Sporting Clube da Covilhã
 Clube Desportivo Trofense
 Clube de Futebol União "da Madeira"

Portuguese Second Division

North
(16 Teams)

 AD Oliveirense
 Carnacha
 Chaves
 Fafe
 Famalicao
 Lousada
 Macedo Cavaleiros
 Maritimo II

 Mereinense
 Mirandela
 Os Limianos
 Ribeira Brava
 Ribeirao
 Tirsense
 Varzim
 Vizela

South
(16 Teams)

 1º Dezembro
 Atletico Reguengos
 Caldas
 Carregado
 Estrela Vendas Novas
 Fatima
 Juventude Evora
 Louletano

 Mafra
 Monsanto
 Moura
 Oriental Lisbon
 Pinhalnovense
 Sertanense
 Torreense
 Tourizense

Central

 Aliados Lordelo
 Amarante
 Anadia
 Angrense
 Boavista
 Cinfaes
 Coimbroes
 Espinho

 Gondomar
 Madalena
 Oliveira Bairro
 Operario
 Padroense
 Parades
 Sao Joao Ver
 Tondela

Third round
In this round entered teams from Liga ZON Sagres (1st level) and the winners from the second round. The matches were played on the 14th, 15th and 16 October 2011.

Fourth round

Draw
The draw for the fourth round was held on 24 October 2011 at 12:00 WET in Portuguese Football Federation (FPF) headquarters situated in Lisbon, Portugal. The last season finalists, Porto and Vitória de Guimarães, were both in draw. Alcochetense and Santa Maria, both from the Terceira Divisão, were the lowest-ranked teams left in the competition at this stage.

Results
The matches were played on November 18, 19 and 20, 2011.

Fifth round

Draw
The draw for the fifth round was held on 22 November 2011 at 12:00 WET at Portuguese Football Federation (FPF) headquarters in Lisbon. The last season's finalists, Porto and Vitória de Guimarães, were eliminated in the previous round. Torreense, Mirandela, Tirsense and Ribeira Brava from the Portuguese Second Division were the lowest-ranked teams left in the competition at this stage.

Results
The matches were played between December 1 and December 5, 2011.

Quarterfinals

Draw
The draw for the quarterfinals was held on 22 November 2011 at 12:00 WET in Portuguese Football Federation (FPF) headquarters situated in Lisbon, Portugal.

Results
The matches were played on December 21 and 22, 2011.

Semifinals

Draw
The draw for the sixth round was held on 28 December 2011 at 12:00 WET in Portuguese Football Federation (FPF) headquarters situated in Lisbon, Portugal.

First leg

Second Leg

Final

Top scorers

Last updated: 27 January 2013

References

External links
Official webpage 

2011-12
2011–12 domestic association football cups
2011–12 in Portuguese football